Monument Circle Historic District is a national historic district located at Warsaw in Wyoming County, New York. It encompasses 21 late 19th and early 20th century civic, religious, and domestic properties. Highlights include the Soldiers and Sailors Monument (1876–1877), Warsaw Public Library (1905), Augustus Frank House (1849-1850), Wyoming County Courthouse (1937), County Sheriff's Office and Jail (ca. 1901), and United Methodist Church (1901–1902).

The district was listed on the National Register of Historic Places in 1992.

References

External links

Monument Circle Historic District - Warsaw, New York - U.S. National Register of Historic Places on Waymarking.com

Georgian architecture in New York (state)
Historic districts in Wyoming County, New York
Historic districts on the National Register of Historic Places in New York (state)
National Register of Historic Places in Wyoming County, New York